Colin James Lawson  (born 24 July 1949) is a British clarinettist, scholar, and broadcaster.

He was born in Saltburn-by-the-Sea and educated at Bradford Grammar School. A pupil of Thea King, Lawson was a member of the National Youth Orchestra of Great Britain during his teenage years. He subsequently read music at Keble College, Oxford.  Postgraduate studies in music at the University of Birmingham saw Lawson awarded an MA in 1972 for his study of the clarinet in eighteenth-century repertoire. His pioneering doctoral research into the chalumeau was completed at the University of Aberdeen in 1976. In 2000, in recognition of his work across theory and practice, Lawson received a DMus from the University of London. In 2015, celebrating Lawson's pre-eminence in performance studies, the University of Sheffield awarded him an HonDMus.

Following academic positions in Aberdeen and Sheffield, Lawson was appointed to the Chair of Performance Studies at Goldsmiths, University of London in 1998. Between 2001 and 2005 he was Pro-Vice Chancellor and Dean of the London College of Music & Media at Thames Valley University (now the University of West London).  In July 2005 he became Director of the Royal College of Music, London, where he holds a Personal Chair in Historical Performance.

Lawson is internationally recognised as a performer of chalumeaux and historical clarinets, having held principal positions with leading British period orchestras, notably The Hanover Band, The English Concert and the London Classical Players, with whom he recorded extensively and toured world-wide. Described as 'a brilliant, absolutely world-class player' (Westdeutsche Allgemeine Zeitung) and ‘the doyen of period clarinettists’ (BBC Music Magazine), he has appeared as soloist in many international venues, including London's major concert halls and New York's Lincoln Center for the Performing Arts and Carnegie Hall.  His extensive discography comprises concertos by Fasch, Hook, Mahon, Mozart, Spohr, Telemann, Vivaldi and Weber, as well as a considerable variety of chamber and orchestral music. Among recent recordings are two discs of sonatas by Xavier Lefèvre and a highly acclaimed CD of the Mozart Clarinet Quintet and other fragments.

Lawson has an especially close association with Mozart’s Clarinet Concerto K622, which he performs regularly on both modern and historical instruments. In addition to directing performances of the work, he has played it in collaboration with conductors such as Roy Goodman, Christopher Hogwood, Roger Norrington and Joshua Rifkin. Lawson’s Cambridge Handbook to Mozart’s Clarinet Concerto (1996) examines the work’s genesis, composition and construction, as well as the career of the dedicatee Anton Stadler and his innovative basset clarinet. His first monograph, The Chalumeau in Eighteenth-Century Music, was published in 1981 by UMI Research Press, and remains the most extensive study of the instrument and its repertoire. Amongst later publications for Cambridge University Press are The Cambridge Companion to the Clarinet (1995), a Cambridge Handbook to Brahms’s Clarinet Quintet (1998) and The Cambridge Companion to the Orchestra (2003). With Robin Stowell he initiated the series of Cambridge Handbooks to the Historical Performance of Music, including their joint introductory volume (1999) as well as his own volume on the early clarinet (2000). The Cambridge History of Musical Performance edited by Lawson and Stowell was published in February 2012. Their most recent volume, The Cambridge Encyclopedia of Historical Performance in Music, was published in September 2018. In 2019 the volume was recognised as an "outstanding work of music reference", winning IAML's C.B. Oldman Award.

In the Queen's 2016 Birthday Honours Lawson was appointed Commander of the Order of the British Empire (CBE) for services to music and music education.

References

External links
 http://www.debretts.com/people-of-today/profile/81415/Colin-James-LAWSON
 http://www.rcm.ac.uk/about/governance/directorate/colinlawson/ 

1949 births
Living people
People educated at Bradford Grammar School
People from Saltburn-by-the-Sea
Alumni of Keble College, Oxford
English clarinetists
British performers of early music
Academics of the Royal College of Music
People associated with the Royal College of Music
Alumni of the University of Birmingham
Commanders of the Order of the British Empire
21st-century clarinetists